Indravati River may also refer to:
Indravati River, a river in Nepal.
Indravati River, a river in India.